Arthur Woodburn (25 October 1890 – 1 June 1978) was a Scottish Labour Party politician.

Born in Edinburgh, he was educated at Heriot-Watt College. Imprisoned as a conscientious objector during World War I, Woodburn worked in engineering and ironfounding administration, and was a lecturer and national secretary of the Scottish Labour College. He was Secretary of the Scottish Council of the Labour Party from 1932 to 1939, and President of the National Council of Labour Colleges from 1937 to 1965. He also served on the Edinburgh 'Hands off Russia' committee in the 1930s.

Woodburn was an unsuccessful candidate for Edinburgh South in 1929 and Edinburgh Leith in 1931; he was Member of Parliament (MP) for Clackmannan and East Stirlingshire from 1939 until 1970.
In Parliament he served as Parliamentary Private Secretary to Tom Johnston in 1941, and Parliamentary Under-Secretary of State in the Ministry of Supply from 1945 to 1947. He was Secretary of State for Scotland from 1947 until 1950 in the government of Clement Attlee. He was made a Privy Councillor in 1947.

Woodburn received an Honorary Doctorate from Heriot-Watt University in 1968.

He had a strong interest in economics, education, European unity, international relations, modern languages and Scottish history. He was appointed to the board of trustees of the National Library of Scotland in 1961 and his papers are held by the Library.

Woodburn was married to Barbara Woodburn, a teacher who was elected to the Edinburgh Town Council.

References

 Pentland, Gordon (ed.), The Autobiography of Arthur Woodburn (1890-1978): Living with History (Boydell & Brewer for the Scottish History Society, 2017)  
 Torrance, David, The Scottish Secretaries (Birlinn 2006)

External links 
 
 National Library of Scotland catalogue of papers
 National Library of Scotland additional papers

1890 births
1978 deaths
British Secretaries of State
British conscientious objectors
Members of the Parliament of the United Kingdom for Stirling constituencies
Members of the Privy Council of the United Kingdom
Ministers in the Attlee governments, 1945–1951
Scottish Labour MPs
UK MPs 1935–1945
UK MPs 1945–1950
UK MPs 1950–1951
UK MPs 1951–1955
UK MPs 1955–1959
UK MPs 1959–1964
UK MPs 1964–1966
UK MPs 1966–1970